Eric Magnusson (c. 1282 – 1318) was a Swedish prince, Duke of Svealand, Södermanland, Dalsland, Västergötland, Värmland and North Halland and heir to the throne of Sweden. His son, Magnus, became king of Norway and Sweden.

Background

Eric was born circa 1282, the second son of King Magnus III of Sweden and his Queen consort Helvig of Holstein. He later became the Duke of Södermanland and a part of Uppland in 1302.

Eric is reported as being more skilled and intelligent than his elder brother who became King Birger of Sweden. He was also bold and ambitious, and his social skills won him many allies. His younger brother Valdemar Magnusson, the duke of Finland, became his close ally and helped him in all his projects.

Life
King Birger, who feared his brothers' plans, forced them to sign a paper, in 1304, so as to render them less dangerous. They then fled to Norway, but in 1305, they reconciled with the king and regained their duchies.

Eric was also in possession of Kungahälla, which he had been given during his exile by the Norwegian king, and northern Halland which he had been given by the Danish king Eric VI of Denmark. Duke Eric planned to topple Birger's marshal Torgils Knutsson who was in the way of his ambitious plans. As the clergy were in opposition to the marshal, they joined Eric. They prevailed on the weak Birger in 1306 to execute Torgils, who was a faithful counsellor. Little more than half a year later, Birger was imprisoned by his brothers (September 1306), and his brothers took control of Sweden.

Birger's brother-in-law, Eric VI of Denmark arrived with his army to support Birger. Haakon V of Norway, however, was on the side of the younger brothers. In 1308, Eric and Valdemar were forced by the Danish king to release Birger, but they did so under humiliating conditions. When Birger was free, he sought aid in Denmark, and the strife began anew. The course of events turned against duke Eric. By concluding a peace treaty with the Danish king, unbeknownst to Haakon V, Eric lost Haakon's trust. Håkon wanted to have Kungahälla back, but Eric refused.

War
A war broke out between Haakon V of Norway and Eric in 1309, and the kings of Norway and Denmark concluded peace, and allied against the dukes. Through his strategic skills, Eric managed to ride out the storm, and defeated the Norwegians, and also the Danes who arrived as far as Nyköping in 1309.

He attacked Norway and reconquered Kungahälla, which he had lost to Haakon in 1310. Finally, there was peace at Helsingborg, in which Sweden was divided between Birger and his brothers. Eric received Västergötland, Dalsland, Värmland and Kalmar County, as well was northern Halland as a fief from Denmark, but he promised to return Kungahälla to Norway.

Marriage
In spite of the fact that Eric never returned Kungahälla, and broke almost all his promises to Haakon, he managed to win his approval. He married Haakon V of Norway's 11-year-old daughter Ingeborg Haakonsdatter. In 1312, Eric married Ingeborg in a double wedding in Oslo. At the same time, Eric's brother Valdemar Magnusson married Ingeborg Eriksdottir of Norway, the daughter of King Eric II of Norway. In 1316 Eric and Ingeborg had a son, the future king Magnus IV of Sweden and in 1317 daughter Euphemia of Sweden.

Duke Eric seemed close to reaching his goals: he was now in possession of a composite territory consisting of some parts of all the three Scandinavian kingdoms, centered on the coast of Skagerrak-Kattegat with Varberg as his ducal seat, he had a son who was the heir apparent of the kingdom of Norway, and he was the de facto ruler of Sweden.

Treachery
However, his career was stopped and his life was shortened by the treachery of his brother King Birger, the de jure ruler of Sweden. During a call on his brother in Nyköping, the so-called Nyköping Banquet, Eric and his brother Valdemar were arrested and chained, the night between 10 and 11 December 1317. No one knows for certain what happened to the two brothers; it was widely assumed that they were starved to death – and for whatever cause, both died within months of being imprisoned.

At the imprisonment of their husbands, their wives became the leaders of their spouses' followers. On 16 April 1318, the two duchesses entered into a treaty in Kalmar with Esger Juul, Archbishop of Lund and Christopher, brother of Eric VI of Denmark and Duke of Halland-Samsö, to free their husbands. Later the same year their husbands were confirmed to have died.

Legacy
King Birger was subsequently ousted by his brothers' supporters in 1318 and sent into exile to his brother-in-law King Eric VI of Denmark. Eric's son, Magnus was elected king of Sweden on 8 July 1319 and acclaimed as hereditary king of Norway in August of the same year under the regencies of his grandmother Queen Helvig and his mother Duchess Ingeborg.

In all of Scandinavia, the deaths of Eric and Valdemar caused great dismay and sorrow, which caused many people to forgive their misdeeds, and only to remember their positive qualities. However, their ambitions had caused great troubles for Sweden. The time of civil war between the brothers were one of the grimmest eras in Swedish history.

Eric's life was portrayed in a positive light in Eric's Chronicle (Erikskrönikan) created by his supporters. Eric's Chronicle is the oldest surviving Swedish chronicle written between about 1320 and 1335. It is one of Sweden's earliest and most important narrative sources. Its authorship and precise political significance and biases are debated, but it is clear that the chronicle's main protagonist and hero is Eric.

References

Sources
 Lindqvist, Herman Historien om Sverige. Från islossning till kungarike (Norstedts: 1997)
 Harrison, Dick Jarlens sekel: en berättelse om 1200-talets Sverige (Ordfront. 2002)
 Bergman, Mats Nyköpingshus. En rundvandring i historia och nutid (Almqvist & Wiksell. 1992)
 Mannervik, Cyrus Sagor och sägner – Från Nordens forntid och medeltid (AV Carlsons. 1958)

1280s births
Year of birth uncertain
1318 deaths
Eric 1282
Norwegian royalty
Dukes of Västergötland
Dukes of Södermanland
Sons of kings